General elections were held in Transjordan on 20 October 1942.

Electoral system
The 1928 basic law provided for a unicameral Legislative Council. The 16 elected members were joined by the six-member cabinet, which included the Prime Minister. The term length was set at three years.

Results
The sixteen elected members were:

By-election
Following the death of Refefan Al-Majali on 24 January 1945, M'arek Al-Majali was elected as a replacement on 1 September. Majed al-Adwan died 2 June 1946, with Noffan al-So'ud elected to replace him on 16 September.

Aftermath
Five governments were formed during the term of the Legislative Council, which was extended by two years to last until 1947.
First government (in office until 9 May 1943)
Led by Ibrahim Hashem and included Ahmad Olwi al-Saqaf, Nuqoula Ghanama, Abdul-Muhdi Al-Shamayleh, Samir al-Rifai and Abdullah Kolayb al-Shraideh.
Second government (9 May 1943 to 14 October 1944)
Led by Tawfik Abu al-Huda and included Shukri Sha'sha'ah, Ahmad Olwi al-Saqaf, Samir al-Rifai, Abdul-Rahman Rshaidat and Hanna al-Qsous. 
Third government (15 October 1944 to 18 May 1945)
Led by Samir al-Rifai and included Sa`id al-Mufti, Hashem Khair, Nuqoula Ghanama, Fahmi Hashem and Msalam al-Attar.
Fourth government (19 May 1945 to 1 February 1947)
Led by Ibrahim Hashem and included Tawfik Abu al-Huda, Sa`id al-Mufti, Nuqoula Ghanama, Fahmi Hashem and Msalam al-Attar.
Fifth government (4 February 1947 to 27 December 1947)
Led by Samir al-Rifai and included Omar al-Attar, Muhammad al-Amin al-Shanqiti, Abbas Mirza, Suleyman al-Nabelsi and Bsharah Ghaseeb.

References

Transjordan
Elections in Jordan
General election
Transjordan